Ștefănești is a commune located in Vâlcea County, Oltenia, Romania. It is composed of four villages: Condoiești, Dobrușa, Șerbănești and Ștefănești.

References

External links

Communes in Vâlcea County
Localities in Oltenia